Chornobai is an urban-type settlement in Zolotonosha Raion (administrative region), within eastern Cherkasy Oblast (province), in central Ukraine. It hosts the administration of Chornobai settlement hromada, one of the hromadas of Ukraine. Population: 

Until 18 July 2020, Chornobai served as an administrative center of Chornobai Raion. The raion was abolished in July 2020 as part of the administrative reform of Ukraine, which reduced the number of raions of Cherkasy Oblast to four. The area of Chornobai Raion was merged into Zolotonosha Raion.

Population 
The population of Chornobai was 7 311 as of 01.07.2015. People from various nationalities live in this urban-type settlement, including people from Azerbaijan, Belarus, Armenia, Georgia, Moldova, Poland, Russia and the Czech Republic.

Name origin 
The name "Chornobai" potentially means the name of one of the first residents. It is believed that a man called "Chornyy Bai" (Black Mr.) found the settlement and named it after himself. In fact, Chornobai had multiple names throughout its history.

Climate 
Chornobai has a continental climate. Average temperature is -6°C in January and +24°C in July.

References

External links

Urban-type settlements in Zolotonosha Raion
Zolotonoshsky Uyezd